Tommy Gun may refer to:

 Nickname for the Thompson submachine gun
 "Tommy Gun", 1978 song by The Clash
 "Tommy-Gun", 2010 single by Royal Republic
 Tommy Gun: How General Thompson's Submachine Gun Wrote History, 2009 book
 Shooting Star Tommy Gun, pneumatic arcade game machinegun

See also
 Tommy Gunn (disambiguation)